Sebastián Enzo Cáceres Ramos (born 18 August 1999) is a Uruguayan professional footballer who plays as a defender for Liga MX club América and the Uruguay national team. 

He made his professional debut on 26 August 2017 in a 2–1 loss against Peñarol. He scored his first goal on 24 February 2019 in a 4–4 draw against Fénix.

On 15 January 2020, Cáceres signed for Liga MX side Club América.

International career
Cáceres is a former Uruguay youth international. He has represented Uruguay at the 2019 South American U-20 Championship, 2019 FIFA U-20 World Cup and 2019 Pan American Games.

In September 2022, Cáceres was called up to the Uruguay national team for the first time. He made his debut on 23 September 2022 in a 1–0 defeat against Iran.

Career statistics

Club

International

References

External links
 

1999 births
Living people
Uruguayan footballers
Uruguay youth international footballers
Uruguay under-20 international footballers
Uruguay international footballers
Footballers from Montevideo
Association football defenders
Uruguayan Primera División players
Liga MX players
Liverpool F.C. (Montevideo) players
Club América footballers
Expatriate footballers in Mexico
Uruguayan expatriate sportspeople in Mexico